The Rolls-Royce/MAN Turbo RB.193 is a vectored thrust turbofan engine designed and manufactured by Rolls-Royce and MAN Turbo in the mid-1960s. The engine test flew in its sole application, the VFW VAK 191B VTOL fighter aircraft but production did not follow after cancellation of the associated aircraft project.

Design and development
The RB.193 was a joint development project by Rolls-Royce/MAN Turbo originally designed to meet a requirement for the VFW VAK 191B project, design work commenced after a contract from the Federal German Ministry of Defence was signed in December 1965. Bristol Siddeley (from 1966 part of Rolls-Royce) were sub-contracted to manufacture components for the engine.

The design was similar in concept and closely related to the earlier Bristol Siddeley Pegasus, employing the same layout of 'hot' and 'cold' pairs of rotating thrust nozzles, internal airflow was the same as the Spey. The engine first ran at Derby in December 1967 with flight testing of the VFW VAK 191B commencing in 1971 with the first free hovering flight taking place at Bremen on 10 September. The aircraft later successfully transitioned from hovering to forward flight at Manching in October 1972. By the end of the test programme in 1975 the RB.193 had accumulated 12 hours of flight time and 91 flights.

Applications
 VFW VAK 191B

Engines on display
A VFW VAK 191B aircraft fitted with an RB.193-12 is on display at the Deutsches Museum Flugwerft Schleissheim, panels have been removed to allow viewing of the rotating nozzle and mechanisms.

Specifications (RB.193-12)

See also

References

External links

 RB.193/VFW VAK 191B at aiaa.org

High-bypass turbofan engines
RB193
1960s turbofan engines